Étienne d'Espagnet (born c. 1596) was the son of parliamentary counselor Jean d'Espagnet and Charlotte De Mangeau. He became a parliamentary counselor in 1617. He married in 1629 and had a son in 1634.

He was friends with Viète and Fermat. d'Espagnet shared mathematical interest with Fermat and was the recipient of at least some of Fermat's mathematical papers.

References

Date of birth unknown
1590s births
French political people
Year of death unknown